This is a list of notable events in country music that took place in the year 2010.

Events
 January 31 – Taylor Swift becomes the youngest person to win the Grammy Award for Album of the Year for her sophomore country album Fearless (2008). Fearless additionally wins the award for Best Country Album, while Swift's "White Horse" is awarded Best Female Country Vocal Performance and Best Country Song.
 February 1 – Loretta Lynn marks 50 years since she signed her first recording contract.
 February 6  – Wynonna Judd announces that she will reunite with her mother, Naomi Judd, to tour and record a studio album for the final time as The Judds by the end of 2010.
 February 13 – Two men in a small pickup truck die from injuries they sustained after colliding with one of Trace Adkins's tour buses. The truck was believed to have crossed the "no passing" line in the center of the road which resulted in the crash. Several members of Adkins' band were aboard the bus, but did not suffer any major injuries. Adkins himself was not on board the bus at the time.
 April 14 – Disney Music Group announces the closure of Lyric Street Records. The label's flagship act, Rascal Flatts, along with Bucky Covington, Kevin Fowler, and Tyler Dickerson follow them within the label's parent company. Three other artists on the roster – Sarah Buxton, Love and Theft and The Parks – are released from the label.
 April 18 – Carrie Underwood becomes the first woman in history to win the Entertainer of the Year award at the Academy of Country Music Awards twice. Underwood previously won the award at the 2009 ceremony.
 May 3 – Chely Wright becomes the first major country artist to come out as homosexual.
 May 4 – Flooding on the Cumberland River in Nashville, Tennessee, causes damage to the Grand Ole Opry House and Gaylord Opryland Resort & Convention Center, with several feet of water. Grand Ole Opry performances are moved to the Ryman Auditorium, War Memorial Auditorium and the Two Rivers Baptist Church; all of which were unaffected by the floods. The common areas of the Gaylord Opryland Hotel were destroyed, and parts of the hotel are under 10 feet of water.
 May 11 – Blake Shelton and Miranda Lambert become engaged after five years of dating.
 May 26 – Country music legend Willie Nelson cuts his "trademark, waist-length braids."
 May 29 – The Lost Trailers announce that they will disband in September after the final date of their 2010 concert tour.
 June 23 – Kellie Pickler and songwriter Kyle Jacobs become engaged after two and a half years of dating.
 July 10 – Carrie Underwood and Ottawa Senators player Mike Fisher marry in a private ceremony in Georgia.
 October 26 – Billy Ray Cyrus and wife Tish file for divorce in Nashville. According to People magazine, the couple filed for divorce documents on Tuesday, October 26, 2010, citing irreconcilable differences Less than a year later, on March 18, 2011, Cyrus announces on The View that he has dropped the divorce.
 October 30 – Randy Travis and wife Elizabeth file for divorce. According to the Associated Press, Randy filed a petition for dissolution of marriage in Albuquerque, N.M. on Thursday, October 28, citing that a "state of incompatibility exists between the parties".
 November 11 – The Nashville Scene publishes a report from representatives of British progressive rock band The Alan Parsons Project, alleging that the chorus of Lady Antebellum's "Need You Now" – which during 2010 became a major crossover smash hit in the U.S. and worldwide – has the same melody as the chorus of Parsons' "Eye In The Sky", a 1982 hit single that peaked at #3 on the Billboard Hot 100.
 December 5 – The John F. Kennedy Center for the Performing Arts honors Merle Haggard for his lifetime contributions to the arts.
 December – The song "Love Like Crazy" by Lee Brice, which peaked at No. 3 on the Billboard Hot Country Songs chart in September, is named the No. 1 country song of 2010, and in doing so becomes the first non-No. 1 song in the chart's 66-year history to earn such an honor. Earlier in the year, "Love Like Crazy" broke the chart's longevity record, spending 55 weeks on the chart and surpassing (by one week) a 62-year-old record, established by Eddy Arnold's "Bouquet of Roses."

Top hits of the year

The following songs placed within the Top 20 on the Hot Country Songs or Canada Country charts in 2010:

Top new album releases
The following albums placed within the Top 50 on the Top Country Albums charts in 2010:

Other top albums

Deaths
 January 16 – Carl Smith, 82, honky tonk-styled star of the 1950s through 1970s.
 January 27 – Shirley Collie Nelson, 78, rockabilly artist, second wife of Willie Nelson.
 May 26 – Judy Lynn, 74, Nashville Sound artist of the 1960s and former beauty pageant queen.
 June 13 – Jimmy Dean, 81, popular country music singer, actor and entrepreneur, best known for his 1961 hit "Big Bad John" and his eponymously named sausage company.
 July 15 – Hank Cochran, 74, songwriter behind hits such as "I Fall to Pieces" and "The Chair" among others.
 July 17 – Fred Carter, Jr., 76, session guitarist and father of country artist Deana Carter.
 July 22 – Margaret Ann Rich, 76, songwriter, wife of the late singer-songwriter Charlie Rich
 July 26 – Ben Keith, 73, session pedal steel guitarist, record producer
 July 31 – George Richey, 74, songwriter and record producer; widower of Tammy Wynette. (chronic obstructive pulmonary disease)
 August 23 – Bill Phillips, 74, singer and songwriter best known for his 1966 country hit, "Put It Off Until Tomorrow", written by Dolly Parton.
 October 24 – Linda Hargrove, 61, singer and songwriter, wrote "Just Get Up and Close the Door" by Johnny Rodriguez.

Hall of Fame inductees

Bluegrass Music Hall of Fame Inductees
John Hartford
Louise Scruggs

Country Music Hall of Fame inductees
Jimmy Dean (August 10, 1928 - June 13, 2010)
Ferlin Husky (December 3, 1925 - March 17, 2011)
Billy Sherrill (November 5, 1936 - August 4, 2015)
Don Williams (May 27, 1939 - September 8, 2017)

Canadian Country Music Hall of Fame inductees
Donna & LeRoy Anderson
Willie P. Bennett
Marie Bottrell
Eddie Eastman
Don Harron
Fred McKenna
Wayne Rostad
Ray St. Germain
Joyce Smith
Tom Tompkins
Hal & Ginger Willis

Major awards

Academy of Country Music
(presented April 3, 2011 in Las Vegas, Nevada)
Entertainer of the Year – Taylor Swift
Top Male Vocalist – Brad Paisley
Top Female Vocalist – Miranda Lambert
Top Vocal Group – Lady Antebellum
Top Vocal Duo – Sugarland
Top New Solo Artist – Eric Church
Top New Duo/Group – The Band Perry
Top New Artist – The Band Perry
Album of the Year – Need You Now, Lady Antebellum
Single Record of the Year – "The House That Built Me", Miranda Lambert
Song of the Year – "The House That Built Me", Miranda Lambert
Video of the Year – "The House That Built Me", Miranda Lambert
Vocal Event of the Year – "As She's Walking Away", Zac Brown Band and Alan Jackson

Americana Music Honors & Awards 
Album of the Year – The List (Rosanne Cash)
Artist of the Year – Ryan Bingham
Duo/Group of the Year – The Avett Brothers
Song of the Year – "The Weary Kind" (Ryan Bingham and T Bone Burnett)
Emerging Artist of the Year – Hayes Carll
Instrumentalist of the Year – Buddy Miller
Spirit of Americana/Free Speech Award – Mary Chapin Carpenter
Lifetime Achievement: Songwriting – John Mellencamp
Lifetime Achievement: Performance – Wanda Jackson
Lifetime Achievement: Instrumentalist – Greg Leisz
Lifetime Achievement: Executive – Luke Lewis
Lifetime Achievement: Producer/Engineer – Brian Ahern

American Country Awards
(presented December 6 in Las Vegas, Nevada)

Artist of the Year – Carrie Underwood
Female Artist of the Year – Carrie Underwood
Male Artist of the Year – Brad Paisley
Group/Duo of the Year – Lady Antebellum
Touring Package of the Year – "Play On Tour", Carrie Underwood
Album of the Year – Play On, Carrie Underwood
Breakthrough Artist of the Year – Easton Corbin
Single of the Year – "Need You Now", Lady Antebellum
Female Single of the Year – "Cowboy Casanova", Carrie Underwood
Male Single of the Year – "Why Don't We Just Dance", Josh Turner
Duo/Group Single of the Year – "Need You Now", Lady Antebellum
Breakthrough Single of the Year – "A Little More Country Than That", Easton Corbin
Music Video of the Year – "Hillbilly Bone", Blake Shelton feat. Trace Adkins
Female Music Video of the Year – "Cowboy Casanova", Carrie Underwood
Male Music Video of the Year – "Hillbilly Bone", Blake Shelton feat. Trace Adkins
Duo/Group Music Video of the Year – "Need You Now", Lady Antebellum
Breakthrough Music Video of the Year – "A Little More Country Than That", Easton Corbin

ARIA Awards 
(presented in Sydney on November 7, 2010)
Best Country Album – Wrapped Up Good (The McClymonts)
ARIA Hall of Fame – John Williamson

Canadian Country Music Association
(presented September 12 in Edmonton)
Fans' Choice Award – Johnny Reid
Male Artist of the Year – Gord Bamford
Female Artist of the Year – Victoria Banks
Group or Duo of the Year – Doc Walker
Songwriter(s) of the Year – "Dance With Me", written by Johnny Reid, Victoria Banks, and Tia Sillers
Single of the Year – "Dance With Me", Johnny Reid
Album of the Year – Day Job, Gord Bamford
Top Selling Album – Fearless, Taylor Swift
Top Selling Canadian Album – Dance with Me, Johnny Reid
CMT Video of the Year – "Day Job", Gord Bamford
Rising Star Award – One More Girl
Roots Artist or Group of the Year – Corb Lund

Country Music Association
(presented November 10 in Nashville)
Single of the Year – "Need You Now", Lady Antebellum
Song of the Year – "The House That Built Me", Tom Douglas and Allen Shamblin
Vocal Group of the Year – Lady Antebellum
New Artist of the Year – Zac Brown Band
Album of the Year – Revolution, Miranda Lambert
Musician of the Year – Mac McAnally
Vocal Duo of the Year – Sugarland
Music Video of the Year – "The House That Built Me", Miranda Lambert
Male Vocalist of the Year – Blake Shelton
Female Vocalist of the Year – Miranda Lambert
Musical Event of the Year – "Hillbilly Bone", Blake Shelton and Trace Adkins
Entertainer of the Year – Brad Paisley

CMT Music Awards(presented June 9 in Nashville)Video of the Year – "Cowboy Casanova", Carrie Underwood
Male Video of the Year – "'Til Summer Comes Around", Keith Urban
Female Video of the Year – "White Liar", Miranda Lambert
Group Video of the Year – "Need You Now", Lady Antebellum
Duo Video of the Year – "Indian Summer", Brooks & Dunn
USA Weekend Breakthrough Video of the Year – "Do I", Luke Bryan
Collaborative Video of the Year – "Hillbilly Bone", Blake Shelton and Trace Adkins
Performance of the Year – "Temporary Home", Carrie Underwood, from CMT Invitation OnlyVideo Director of the Year – Shaun Silva
Nationwide Is On Your Side Award – Chris Young

CMT Artists of the Year
 (presented December 1 in Nashville)Jason Aldean
Lady Antebellum
Taylor Swift
Carrie Underwood
Zac Brown Band

Grammy Awards(presented February 13, 2011)Best Female Country Vocal Performance – "The House That Built Me", Miranda Lambert
Best Male Country Vocal Performance – "'Til Summer Comes Around", Keith Urban
Best Country Performance by a Duo or Group with Vocals – "Need You Now", Lady Antebellum
Best Country Collaboration with Vocals – "As She's Walking Away", Zac Brown Band and Alan Jackson
Best Country Instrumental Performance – "Hummingbyrd", Marty Stuart
Best Country Song – "Need You Now", Dave Haywood, Josh Kear, Charles Kelley and Hillary Scott
Best Country Album – Need You Now, Lady Antebellum
Best Bluegrass Album – Mountain Soul II, Patty Loveless

Juno Awards(presented March 27, 2011 in Toronto)Country Album of the Year – A Place Called Love'', Johnny Reid

References

Other links
 Country Music Association
 Inductees of the Country Music Hall of Fame

Country
Country music by year